Chintana Souksavath (born 20 July 1990 in Vientiane) is a Laotian football player. He is a member of Laos national football team. He also played for Lao Toyota FC in 2016.

References

External links

1990 births
Living people
Laotian footballers
Laos international footballers
People from Vientiane

Association footballers not categorized by position